Sir Pazhamaneri Sundaram Sivaswami Iyer  (7 February 1864 – 5 November 1946) was a prominent lawyer, administrator and statesman who served as the Advocate General of Madras from 1907 to 1911.

Sivaswami Iyer was born on 7 February 1864 in the village of Palamaneri. He had his schooling in Palamaneri and graduated from Presidency College, Madras. Sivaswami Iyer studied law and practised as a lawyer serving as the Advocate-general of Madras Presidency from 1907 to 1911. He also served as a member of the executive council of the Governor of Madras and as a member of the Council of State. Sivawami Iyer died on 5 November 1946 at the age of 82.

Sivaswami Iyer was also active in the Indian independence movement and presented India's case before the League of Nations. He was a keen connoisseur of arts and library science.

Early life 

Sivaswami Iyer was born to Sundaram Iyer  and Subbalakshmi in the village of Palamaneri on 7 February 1864. He belonged to the Palamaneri Brahacharanam who traced their descent from Krishnan Raman Brahmarayar, the commander-in-chief of the Chola army under Rajendra Chola.

Sivaswami had his schooling at the S. P. G. Branch School and the Manambuchavadi High School from where he matriculated with a first class in 1877. Sivaswami did his F. A. at the Government Arts College, Kumbakonam and graduated from Presidency College, Madras in January 1882, with a first class in Sanskrit and History. He studied law from Madras Law College and set up practice as a lawyer in 1885.

Law, Government Service, and Education 

After successfully practicing law for nearly twenty years, Sivaswami Iyer entered politics. being appointed to  the Governor's  of Madras' Legislative Council as an additional member in charge of making rules and regulations in 1904. After this he was appointed Advocate-General of Madras Presidency. 
 
Sivaswami Iyer was elected to the senate of the Madras University in 1898 and served as Vice-Chancellor of the Madras University from 1916 to 1918. From 13 April 1918 to 8 May 1919, he served as the Vice Chancellor of Banaras Hindu University.

Politics 

Sivaswami Iyer entered politics in 1912 when he was appointed member of the Executive Council of the Governor of Madras as per the Minto Morley scheme and served from 1912 to 1917. During the First World War, he was instrumental in raising support for the Indian Volunteer Movement in order to provide support to the United Kingdom. His moderate views and weak opposition to Government policies including the widely condemned internment of Annie Besant during his tenure as member of the executive council earned him the displeasure of Indian nationalists. However, in 1919, Sivaswami Iyer expressed strong condemnation of the Jallianwala Bagh massacre.

Sivaswami Iyer was the Indian delegate to the third session of the League of Nations in 1922 in which, he condemned the mandate policy of General Smuts of the Republic of South Africa. Sivaswami Iyer served as a member of the Council of State from 1922 to 1923. He also opposed the Simon Commission on its arrival in India.

Sivaswami Iyer served as a member of the Imperial Legislative Assembly, in which he spoke often on military matters.

Later life and death 

In 1931, he was appointed member of the new Indian Military College Committee. During his later years, he expressed strong disapproval of any attempt to partition the subcontinent.

Sivaswami Iyer died in his Madras home on 5 November 1946 at the age of 82. On his death, the Lady Sivaswami Iyer girls school was named after him in his memory.

Legacy and criticism 

Sivaswami Iyer was an avid reader and a connoisseur of arts. He was a strong advocate of women's education and supported sweeping reforms to this regard. He took a special interest in military matters and served as a member of the Indian Military College Committee set up to establish an indigenous military academy on the model of Sandhurst.

Sivaswami Iyer was known for his mastery over Sanskrit and his love for the language. He is also known for his vehement attacks on Tamil extremists whom he once mocked as the "rabble in the towns".

Family 

Sivaswami Iyer's father Pazhamaneri Sundaram Iyer was a matriculate of the S. P. G. Mission High School in Tanjore. He served as a school teacher in the Mission School at Pattukkottai before enrolling as a pleader in the Tanjore Bar. Sundaram's wife Subbalakshmi hailed from the neighbouring village of Marur. Sivaswami had two younger brothers - Chandrasekaran, Sitharaman and Subrahmanyan and two sisters - Dharmambal and Sundari.

Honours 

Sivaswami Iyer was made a Companion of the Order of the Indian Empire in the 1908 New Year Honours and a Companion of the Order of the Star of India in 1912. He was promoted to a Knight Commander of the Order of the Star of India in 1915.

Works

Notes

References

Biographies

External links
 A short biography of Sir P.S.Sivaswami Iyer

1864 births
1946 deaths
Knights Commander of the Order of the Star of India
Presidency College, Chennai alumni
Companions of the Order of the Indian Empire
Indian knights
Members of the Central Legislative Assembly of India
People from Thanjavur district
Vice Chancellors of Banaras Hindu University
Advocates General for Tamil Nadu
Vice Chancellors of the University of Madras
Members of the Madras Legislative Council
19th-century Indian lawyers
20th-century Indian lawyers
Scholars from Tamil Nadu
Members of the Council of the Governor General of India